The Jing Ting Mountain, with the ancient name of Zhao Ting Mountain, is in the northern suburbs of Xuancheng City, Anhui province, China.

History 

Before the Jin Dynasty, the mountain was known as Zhao Ting Mountain. In 266 AD, its name was changed to Jing Ting Mountain (Jingtingshan) to avoid the name taboo of the emperor, Sima Zhao.

Jing Ting Mountain and the scenery therein has been the frequent subject of poetry and artwork. The poems written by Xie Tiao (464–499) of the Southern Qi Dynasty brought it a widespread reputation. From then on, the area was visited frequently by many poets and litterateurs. The famous Chinese ancient poet Li Bai (699-762) said that "only Jing Ting Mountain can keep attracting you without boredom." Over 1,000 poems were written about Jing Ting Mountain and, therefore, it is regarded as the "Mountain of Poetry" in China.

References 

Mountains of Anhui
Xuancheng
Tourist attractions in Anhui